Renato Cipriani (born 2 April 1917) was an Italian professional football player.

Cipriani spent 4 seasons in the Serie A with A.S. Roma, playing 2 games.

References

External links
Profile at Enciclopediadelcalcio.it

1917 births
Possibly living people
Italian footballers
Serie A players
A.S. Roma players
Association football midfielders